= Stout Burgers and Beers =

American restaurant chain

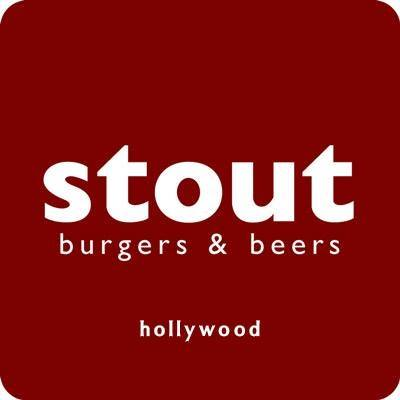

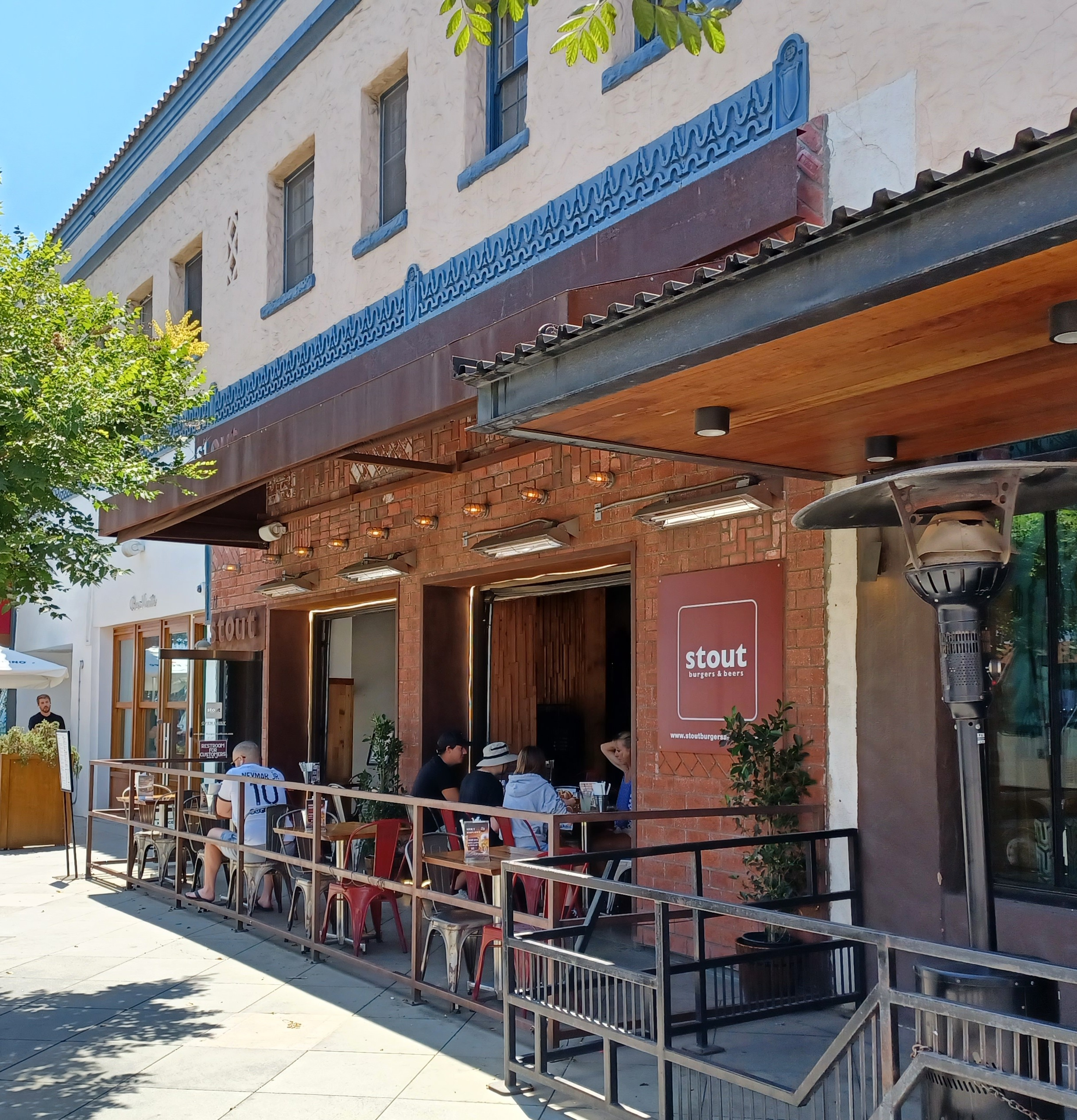
- Exterior of the restaurant in Santa Monica, California, 2023

Restaurant information
- Established: 2010
- Location: United States
- Website: stoutburgersandbeers.com

Stout Burgers and Beers is a restaurant chain based in Los Angeles, in the U.S. state of California. The business closed its doors January 2026.

== History ==
Philip Camino is a partner.

=== Locations ===
There have been restaurants in the following cities:

- Brentwood, Tennessee
- Louisville, Kentucky
- Santa Monica
- Studio City

== Reception ==
Matthew Kang included the restaurant in Eater LA's 2014 list of "15 Great Places to Drink Craft Beer in LA".
